The Commie Awards was an award show that recognized the best in comedy in various categories. It was produced by Comedy Central and meant to be a replacement for the defunct American Comedy Awards.

The first ceremony aired on the network on December 7, 2003. The show featured Rodney Dangerfield receiving a lifetime achievement award, and a campaign to release Tommy Chong from prison. The show also parodied awards shows themselves with such gags as not awarding Commies to those not present and choosing to then go through the list of nominees until one was present to accept the award or until they began shouting random names of celebrities until a winner was awarded. However for unknown reasons the network discontinued the awards and would not air another comedy awards ceremony until the 2011 Comedy Awards.

American comedy and humor awards
Comedy Central original programming
2000s in comedy